Wee Sing is an American songbook series originally published by Price Stern Sloan. It would also inspire a series of children's CDs, cassettes, coloring books, toys, videos, and apps.

History
Pam Beall and Susan Nipp were school teachers in Portland, Oregon in the late 1970s when they decided to start Wee Sing. At the time, the four wanted to create a musical education series suitable for children. Beall and Nipp wanted to teach common children's nursery rhymes and songs to their children, but found that other teachers were unfamiliar with the songs on which they had grown up. They then published the first songbook under the Wee Sing title in 1977. Due to the local popularity of the book, it was picked up for distribution by Price Stern Sloan, who then distributed recordings of the songs on audiocassette and VHS as well, more than four million Wee Sing books had been sold.

In 2004, Beall and Nipp re-acquired the rights to the Wee Sing library back from Penguin Group, who bought Price Stern Sloan in 1993.

Reception
Anne Reeks of Entertainment Weekly reviewed the first six Wee Sing videos, giving them grades between A and C.

Wee Sing videography

Live-Action Video
Wee Sing Together (1985)
King Cole's Party (1987)
Grandpa's Magical Toys (1988)
Wee Sing in Sillyville (1989)
The Best Christmas Ever! (1990)
Wee Sing in the Big Rock Candy Mountains (1991)
Wee Sing in the Marvelous Musical Mansion (1992)
The Wee Sing Train (1993)
Wee Sing Under the Sea (1994)
Wee Singdom: The Land of Music and Fun (1996)

Clip Show Video
Wee Sing Favorites Volume 1: Animal Songs (1996)
Wee Sing Favorites Volume 2: Classic Songs for Kids (1996)

Wee Sing Books and Audio

Wee Sing Classic Line
 Wee Sing Children's Songs and Fingerplays (1977) (first released as Wee Sing) 
 Wee Sing and Play (1979)
 Wee Sing Silly Songs (1981)
 Wee Sing Sing-Alongs (1982) (first released as Wee Sing Around the Campfire) 
 Wee Sing for Christmas (1984)
 Wee Sing Nursery Rhymes and Lullabies (1985)
 Wee Sing Bible Songs (1986)
 Wee Sing America (1987)
 Wee Sing Over in the Meadow (1987)
 Wee Sing Fun 'n' Folk (1989)
 Wee Sing Dinosaurs (1991)
 Wee Sing Around the World (1994)
 Wee Sing More Bible Songs (1995)
 Wee Sing for Baby (1996)
 Wee Sing Games Games Games (1998)
 Wee Sing in the Car (1999)
 Wee Sing Animals Animals Animals (1999)
 Wee Sing and Pretend (2001)
 Wee Sing the Best of Wee Sing (2002) (first released as Wee Sing 25th Anniversary Celebration)
 Wee Sing for Halloween (2002)
 Wee Sing Mother Goose (2006)
 Wee Sing and Move (2009)
 Wee Sing Lullabies (2012)

Wee Sing & Learn
 Wee Sing & Learn ABCs Wee Sing & Learn 123s Wee Sing & Learn Colors Wee Sing & Learn Dinosaurs Wee Sing & Learn Opposites Wee Sing & Learn Bugs Wee Sing & Learn My BodyWee Color
 Wee Color Wee Sing Wee Color Wee Sing and Play Wee Color Wee Sing Silly Songs Wee Color Wee Sing Around the Campfire Wee Color Wee Sing for Christmas Wee Color Wee Sing Nursery Rhymes and Lullabies Wee Color Wee Sing Bible Songs Wee Color Wee Sing America Wee Color Wee Sing Australia Wee Color Wee Sing Dinosaurs Wee Color Wee Sing Together Wee Color Wee Sing King Cole's PartyWee Sing appsWee Sing & Learn ABCsWee Sing & Learn 123s''

References

External links
 

1980s musical films
1980s children's films
1990s musical films
1990s children's films
Film series introduced in 1985
American musical films
Child musical groups
Sentient toys in fiction
Films about size change
Early childhood education in the United States
Puppet films
Films based on children's books
Films about children
Films about magic
Films about toys
Compilation album series
1990s English-language films
1980s English-language films
1980s American films
1990s American films
Early childhood education